Steve "S. J." Watson (born 1971) is an English writer. He debuted in 2011 with the thriller novel Before I Go to Sleep. Rights to publish the book have been sold in 42 different countries around the world and it has continued to be an international bestseller.

Personal life
Watson was born in Stourbridge, Worcestershire (now West Midlands). He studied Physics at the University of Birmingham and then moved to London, where he worked in various hospitals and specialized as an audiologist in the diagnosis and treatment of hearing-impaired children. In the evenings and weekends he wrote fiction.

Writing career 
In 2009 Watson was accepted for the first course Writing a Novel at the Faber Academy. The result was his debut, Before I Go to Sleep. He was introduced to literary agent Clare Conville on the last night of the course and she agreed to represent him. The book was published in 2011. In the same year, the rights to adapt the film for the big screen by was purchased. The film was released in 2014.

Watson's second novel, Second Life, was published in February 2015, with two further books scheduled for 2017 and 2019.

S J Watson published his third novel with Transworld, Final Cut, about a documentary film-maker who starts to uncover a seaside community's "dark and extraordinary secret".

Media interest 
Media interest in Before I Go to Sleep was considerable and Watson himself was the subject of a profile in the Sunday Times before its UK publication, and The Wall Street Journal before its US publication. Watson has been profiled by Bookseller+Publisher, and interviewed by Kirsty Lang on BBC Radio 4's Front Row. He has also been interviewed by Simon Mayo, when Before I Go to Sleep was chosen as Mayo's bookclub book of the month.

Bibliography 

Watson, S. J. (2020), Final Cut, Transworld Publishers,

References 

1971 births
Living people
21st-century English novelists
People from Stourbridge
Alumni of the University of Birmingham
Audiologists
English male novelists
21st-century English male writers